Kailash Sharma is an Indian politician and member of the Bharatiya Janata Party. Sharma was a member of the Uttarakhand Legislative Assembly from the Almora constituency in Almora district.

References 

People from Almora district
Bharatiya Janata Party politicians from Uttarakhand
Members of the Uttarakhand Legislative Assembly
Living people
21st-century Indian politicians
Year of birth missing (living people)